Morir dos veces (English: Die Twice) is a Mexican telenovela produced by José Rendón for Televisa. It premiered on Canal de las Estrellas on February 26, 1996 and ended on May 10, 1996.

Carina Ricco and Eduardo Palomo starred as protagonists, while Manuel Landeta and Alejandra Ávalos starred as antagonists.

Plot 
Silvana is a housewife like any other, lives with her daughter Andrea and her husband Cristóbal, working together in a craft shop that Silvana got after his father died.

Cristóbal and Silvana passed through a bad phase, so they thought about divorcing but Silvana tries at all costs to save their marriage, unfortunately Silvana plans to keep his family vanish with the death of Cristóbal.

She does not understand how her husband so young, may have suffered from a heart attack. Cristóbal's body was still alive when Silvana finds him in his business and realizes that this has been ransacked.

After a while the mob began harassing the poor widow to collect five million dollars that her husband had stolen. Esteban Pizarro commander is in charge of the case and discover the links that Cristóbal had with the Mafia and drug trafficking.

Pizarro was suspected Silvana who actually killed Cristóbal to keep the money, making everyone believe he is innocent, so he tries to unmask approach her, but all he discovers is that is madly in love with her.

Even though everyone thinks that Cristóbal has died, the returns become an evil man willing to take revenge and destroy his wife and the commander Pizarro.

Cast 
 
Carina Ricco as Silvana Ruiz
Eduardo Palomo as Esteban Pizarro
Manuel Landeta as Cristóbal Ruiz/Andrés Acosta
Alejandra Ávalos as Martha Luján
Susana Alexander as Beatriz
Irma Lozano as Carmen
José Carlos Ruiz as Orduña
José Elías Moreno as Aarón Zermeño
Javier Díaz Dueñas as Mauricio
Malena Doria as Mayra "Cuca"
Elizabeth Katz as Lucy
Jaime Garza as Sergio Terán
Octavio Galindo as Rubiano
Vanessa Bauche as Carla
Emely Faride as Yolanda
Jaime Lozano as Isaías
Luis Couturier as Enrique
Constanza Mier as Andrea Ruiz
Martha Ortiz as Gloria
Mónika Sánchez as Minerva
Ernesto Rivas as Nacho
Carlos Rotzinger as Fernando Robles
Fernando Sáenz as Víctor
Enrique Singer as Julio Tafoya
Jorge Victoria as Marcelino
Jacqueline Robynson as Nancy
María Dolores Oliva as La Chata
Gonzalo Sánchez as Nicolás
Susana González
Rodrigo Abed
Sabine Moussier as Paulette
Jorge Capin
Esteban Franco
Ángeles Balvanera
Francisco Chanes
Carlos Gusih
Rubén Morales
Ileana Pereira
Úrsula Muno
Jaime Vega
Ricardo Vera

References

External links

1996 telenovelas
Mexican telenovelas
1996 Mexican television series debuts
1996 Mexican television series endings
Spanish-language telenovelas
Television shows set in Mexico
Televisa telenovelas